Jim Flegg OBE is a British horticulturalist, broadcaster, ornithologist and writer on bird-related matters.

Flegg was a zoology graduate of Imperial College London and spent much of his subsequent professional career working in horticulture at the East Malling Research Station.

He has also had a lifelong interest in ornithology, having joined the Rochester and District Natural History Society as a junior member. As an ornithologist, he has become well-known, having become president of Kent Ornithological Society in 1977, and is a former Director of the British Trust for Ornithology. He was a national household name because of his role as a presenter on the Coastal Ways and Country Ways television programmes.

He is a bird ringer and has ringed over 30,000 birds.

Among the books Flegg has authored are the Photographic Field Guide: Birds of Australia, and a number of books designed to interest children in living things from an early age.

References 

British ornithologists
Officers of the Order of the British Empire
Living people
Year of birth missing (living people)
Alumni of Imperial College London